Queen: Love and War is a 2019 South Korean television series starring Jin Se-yeon, Kim Min-kyu, Do Sang-woo, Lee Yul-eum, and Lee Si-eon. This series was aired on TV Chosun every Saturday and Sunday at 22:50 KST from December 14, 2019 to February 9, 2020. The series is also available for exclusive streaming on iQIYI for selected regions.

Synopsis
Kang Eun-gi (Jin Se-yeon) becomes the Queen of Joseon. During their Wedding Day Parade, Eun-gi and Lee Kyung (Kim Min-kyu) are ambushed and shot by assassins. Both Royals are assumed to have been killed, however, the night after the bullet is removed from the king's head and he is laid to rest under the guard of the priestesses the dead king resurrects while Kang Eun-gi's twin sister, Kang Eun-bo is acting under the guise of an assistant to the Chief Priestess to gain answers about the murderers.
Assuming the King's death the Great Queen Dowager Min (Jung Ae-ri) is presented with a candidate for a new King by the Left State Minister, Jo Heung-Gyeon (Lee Jae-yong) who embarks immediately to retrieve the exiled Prince Lee Jae-Hwa (Do Sang-woo). Upon their return to the palace, the Left State Minister and Prince are both shocked and angry to learn that the king is still alive and recovering but cover it well and go their separate ways. 
The father of the dead queen, Kang Yi-Soo (Lee Ki-young) due to the politics in the palace is accused of treason after having been discovered for writing the Theory of Enlightenment and indoctrinating his daughter. Lee Kyung doesn't believe the conspiracy and attempts to save Kang Yi-Soo with a secret jailbreak that ends up ruined by another member of the court. Kang Yi-Soo swears his loyalty to Lee Kyung in the end and 
chooses to accept the sentence of death by hanging to save Lee Kyung from any further political battle. Unable to find the Queen's murderers in time or clear their father's name Kang Eun-Bo is helpless to watch in the crowd of spectators, Kang Yi-soo notices her in the crowd in his final moments and smiles at her. 
Taking a chance at revenge Eun-Bo goes to Kang Yi-Soos closest friend and the only person outside their family who knew about the twin daughters, Baek Ja-Yong (Um Hyo-sup) she recklessly demands to know of any way to kill the king. He takes her in to recover from her grief and later reveals Kang Yi-Soo's vision to her and promises that he will help Eun-Bo see her mother again if she can help him take revenge on the king for the death of her father. Longing to see her last remaining family she agrees and becomes caught in the middle of discovering who is responsible for the death of her sister and father.
The palace begins to look for a new queen for Lee Kyung to calm down unrest in the court and any rumors concerning the king's behavior after his resurrection. With anger and determination to find the mastermind behind the murder of her twin sister, Eun-bo participates in the selection under the name Hong-yeon, daughter of Gyeong-gi Governor Hong Ki-ho. The closer they get to each other Lee Kyung begins to have vivid dreams, precognition due to which he is able to predict what may happen to Eun-bo in the near future. What does the palace hold for Eun-bo? Will she be able to win the selection and capture the assassins?

Cast

Main
 Jin Se-yeon as Kang Eun-bo / Kang Eun-gi
 Choi Myung-bin as young Kang Eun-bo / Kang Eun-gi
 Kim Min-kyu as Lee Kyung
 Park Min-su as young Lee Kyung
 Do Sang-woo as Lee Jae-hwa
 Lee Yul-eum as Jo Young-ji
 Lee Si-eon as Wal
 Gil Jung-woo as young Wal

Supporting

People around Kang Eun-bo
 Um Hyo-sup as Baek Ja-yong
 Lee Yoon-gun as Hong Ki-ho, Governor of Gyeong-gi Province; Minister of Justice
 Lee Ki-young as Kang Yi-soo, Eun-gi and Eun-bo's father
 Choo Soo-bin as Yeo-wul, Eun-bo's lady-in-waiting and confidant.
 Lee Kan-hee as Lady Han, Eun-gi and Eun-bo's mother

People around Lee Kyung
 Kim Bum-jin as Han Mo
 Ahn Se-ha as Eunuch Hwang

People around Jo Young-ji
 Lee Jae-yong as Jo Heung-gyeon, father of Jo Young-ji; Left State Councillor
 Choi Na-moo as Byeo-ri, Jo Young-Ji's maid

People inside the Palace
 Jung Ae-ri as Great Queen Dowager Min, grandmother of Lee Kyung
 Jo Eun-sook as Queen Mother Kim, mother of Lee Kyung

Andong Kim Clan
 Son Byong-ho as Kim Man-chan; Prime Minister
 Lee Hwa-kyum as Kim Song-yi, Hyung-chan's daughter 
 Yoon Ki-won as Kim Hyung-chan

Others
 Jo Mi-nyeo as Bang Ye-sil
 Song Ji-woo as Jong-Hee
 Go Yoon as Gae-pyung
 Kim Joo-yeong as Ha Dan-yeong
 Kwon Jae-hwan as Kwon Ik-soo
 Jang Seong-yun as Hong-yeon, Governor Hong Ki-ho's daughter
 Kim Sung-bum as Gi-chil, Uigeumbu's officer
 Ha Eun-jin as Cho-hyang, a gisaeng
 Seo Kyung-hwa as Court Lady Jeong, Great Queen Dowager Min's lady in-waiting
 Lee Joo-Jin as Uigeumbu's officer
 Kim Jae-il as Il-won
 Hong Seong-Sook as Seongsucheong's shaman
 Han Da-mi as a court lady who serve Andong Kim's family
 Kim Young-ah as Eun-bo's court lady who works under Kim Song-Yi; but for the last time, she helps Eun-bo sincerely

Original soundtrack

Part 1

Part 2

Part 3

Part 4

Part 5

Part 6

Part 7

Part 8

Part 9

Viewership

Notes

References

External links
  
 
 

TV Chosun television dramas
Korean-language television shows
2019 South Korean television series debuts
2020 South Korean television series endings
South Korean historical television series
South Korean fantasy television series
South Korean romance television series
Television series set in the Joseon dynasty